Auburn is a city in King County, Washington, United States (with a small portion crossing into neighboring Pierce County). The population was 87,256 at the 2020 Census. Auburn is a suburb in the Seattle metropolitan area, and is currently ranked as the 14th largest city in the state of Washington.

Auburn is bordered by the cities of Federal Way, Pacific, and Algona to the west, Sumner to the south, Kent to the north, and unincorporated King County to the east. The Muckleshoot Indian Reservation lies to the south and southeast.

History

Before the first non-indigenous settlers arrived in the Green River Valley in the 1850s, the area was home to the Muckleshoot people, who were temporarily driven out by Indian wars later that decade. Several settler families arrived in the 1860s, including Levi Ballard, who set up a homestead between the Green and White rivers. Ballard filed for a plat to establish a town in February 1886, naming it Slaughter for an officer slain during the Indian wars in 1855.

Slaughter was incorporated on June 13, 1891, but its name was changed two years later to Auburn on February 21, 1893, by an action of the state legislature. Newer residents had disliked the name and its connection to the word "", especially after the town's hotel was named the Slaughter House. The name Auburn was chosen in honor of Auburn, New York, for the area's shared reliance on hops farming.

The White and Green Rivers have been a major part of the history and culture of Auburn since the area was settled with multiple locations in the city being named after either of the two rivers. Frequent flooding from the rivers caused numerous problems for the people living in the community with one outcome being the creation of Mountain View Cemetery over on one of the hills overlooking the valley. It was not until the completion of the Mud Mountain Dam and the Howard A. Hanson Dam, along the White River and Green River respectively, that the flooding would cease and allow the city to grow without the aforementioned hurdle impeding the growth.

In 1917 the city, in response to the growing of the Japanese community, donated some of the land in Pioneer Cemetery to the White River Buddhist Church. A little over ten years later, Rev. Giryo Takemura, minister of the church at the time, and his future son-in-law, Chiyokichi Natsuhara, raised money to replace the old wooden sticks and columns that had been in use as gravestones at the Cemetery with more durable concrete markers. The interwar period saw several Japanese-American baseball teams from the area compete in the courier league with the White River All-Stars enjoying particularly large success winning four of the July 4th tournaments.
In 1930 a Japanese bath house was constructed outside of Neely Mansion by the then current tenants.

The onset of the Second World War saw the Japanese-American community of Auburn become seen with largely unwarranted distrust by many of the white residents of Auburn. This, combined with a larger countrywide Japanese focused xenophobia, led to the city's Japanese-American population being relocated to internment camps. After the war, of about 300 Japanese families living in Auburn only around twenty five returned.

In 2008, Auburn annexed the West Hill and Lea Hill neighborhoods of unincorporated King County, adding 15,000 residents and expanding its land area by 26 percent.

Geography

Two rivers, the White River and, to a greater extent, the Green River flow through Auburn.

Historically, the Stuck River ran through the settlement of Stuck, which is now a small pocket of unincorporated King County within southern Auburn. In 1906, the flow of the White River was diverted into the Stuck's channel near today's Game Farm Park.  References to the Stuck River still appear in some property legal descriptions and place names, e.g. Stuck River Drive, within Auburn, but today it is essentially indistinguishable from the southern White River.

Neighborhoods

 Downtown—Historic buildings with a traditional main street and also many Craftsman-style houses from the 1920s.
 North Auburn—A mix of commercial and single-family housing separated by Auburn Way North.
 River's Bend—A small residential neighborhood nestled along the Green River, located at the bottom of Lea Hill in North Auburn.
 Christopher/Thomas—An area in North Auburn roughly bordered by the Valley Drive Inn and 227th Street. Both are former farming towns annexed into the city in the 1960s.
 Lea Hill—A mainly residential neighborhood east of the valley, annexed into the city in 2007. Green River College is located here.
 Hazelwood—The area on Lea Hill between Green River Community College, and Auburn Mountainview High School. Once a town in the late nineteenth century.
 West Valley—A commercial and industrial area on the west side of SR 167, located on the bottom of West Hill.
 West Hill—Located on the West Hill, bordered by the city of Federal Way to the west.
 South Auburn—A general area located south of downtown, once a low-income area but becoming a commercial zone.
 Terminal Park—An area of middle class housing near the end of the rail yard named for the railroad workers who lived there.
 Forest Villa—Mainly residential area located in the Game Farm Park area.
 Lakeland Hills—A master-planned community sprawling on a large hillside at the southern end of the city on both sides of King and Pierce counties.
 Hidden Valley—A planned development located East of Lakeland Hills overlooking North Lake Tapps.

Climate

Demographics

2010 census
As of the census of 2010, there were 70,180 people, 26,058 households, and 17,114 families residing in the city. The racial makeup of the city was 70.5% White, 4.9% African American, 2.3% Native American, 8.9% Asian, 1.6% Pacific Islander, 6.3% from other races, and 5.4% from two or more races. Hispanic or Latino people of any race were 12.9% of the population.

There were 26,058 households, of which 36.2% had children under the age of 18 living with them, 46.7% were married couples living together, 13.0% had a female householder with no husband present, 5.9% had a male householder with no wife present, and 34.3% were non-families. 25.6% of all households were made up of individuals, and 7.9% had someone living alone who was 65 years of age or older. The average household size was 2.67 and the average family size was 3.22.

The median age in the city was 34.4 years. 25.9% of residents were under the age of 18; 10.5% were between the ages of 18 and 24; 27.9% were from 25 to 44; 25.5% were from 45 to 64; and 10.2% were 65 years of age or older. The gender makeup of the city was 49.4% male and 50.6% female.

Crime
According to the Uniform Crime Report statistics compiled by the Federal Bureau of Investigation (FBI) in 2020, there were 329 violent crimes and 3,516 property crimes per 100,000 residents. Of these, the violent crimes consisted of 9 murders, 38 forcible rapes, 122 robberies and 160 aggravated assaults, while 569 burglaries, 2,248 larceny-thefts, 680 motor vehicle thefts and 19 acts of arson defined the property offenses.

Economy

Employment

As of 2020, 68.9% of the population is in the labor force with a 3.7% unemployment rate.

With over 5,000 employees, the Boeing plant is the third major employer in Auburn.

Auburn is the site for the Northwest headquarters of United States General Services Administration.

According to Auburn's 2020 Comprehensive Annual Financial Report, the top employers in the city are:

Shopping
The Outlet Collection Seattle, formerly SuperMall of the Great Northwest, is an outlet mall which opened in 1995.

Arts and culture
The White River Valley Museum's exhibits feature Auburn, from Native American history to the 1920s. They focus on the Muckleshoot Indian Tribe, pioneer life, immigration from Europe and Japan, truck farming, railroading and the building of towns throughout the area. Visitors can visit a recreation of a pioneer cabin, climb aboard a Northern Pacific Railway caboose, and investigate a recreation of the shops in 1924 downtown Auburn.

As part of the King County Library System, there is a  facility built in 2000 and expanded in 2012 having replaced an earlier, nearby location. It is part of the Les Gove Park, a 20 acre community campus south of State Route 164 including the White River Valley Museum, a senior center, and other recreational services. Fourth of July and other celebrations such as Auburn Good Ol' Days are also held in Les Gove annually.

Auburn is designated by the Veterans Day National Committee and the US Department of Veterans Affairs as a Regional Site for celebration of Veterans Day.

Sports

Emerald Downs is a  six-level stadium and thoroughbred racetrack. The racetrack is operated on land purchased by the Muckleshoot in 2002.

Parks and recreation

Government

The city of Auburn is a mayor-council form of government meaning the mayor is a full-time, separately elected position. The current Mayor is Nancy Backus, who was first elected to the post in 2013 and re-elected in 2017 and 2021. She is the first woman to serve in the office since Auburn was incorporated in 1891.

The Auburn Police Department is located within the Justice Building, along with the Municipal Court and jail.

Education

Public schools are administered by the Auburn School District. The district is larger than the city itself, serving the neighboring towns of Algona and Pacific, as well as some unincorporated areas around Auburn and Kent.

High schools
 Auburn High School
 Auburn Mountainview High School
 Auburn Riverside High School
 Auburn Adventist Academy
 West Auburn High School

Elementary and middle schools

 Arthur Jacobsen Elementary
 Bowman Creek Elementary
 Cascade Middle School
 Chinook Elementary
 Dick Scobee Elementary
 Evergreen Heights Elementary
 Gildo Rey Elementary
 Hazelwood Elementary
 Ilalko Elementary
 Lake View Elementary
 Lakeland Hills Elementary
 Lea Hill Elementary
 Mt. Baker Middle School
 Olympic Middle School
 Pioneer Elementary
 Rainier Middle School
 Terminal Park Elementary
 Washington Elementary

Private and alternative schools
 Auburn Adventist Academy
 Rainier Christian High School
 Valley Christian School
 Holy Family School

College
 Green River College

Infrastructure

Transportation

Auburn has many large roads nearby and within city limits, including State Route 167 (commonly referred as the "Valley Freeway") and State Route 18. Auburn also has its own transit center, Auburn station in downtown, that serves as a major hub for southern King County. Sound Transit buses connect the Auburn Transit Center directly to Federal Way, Sumner, and Kent, while King County Metro buses connect it to Green River Community College, the Super Mall, and Auburn Way.

Sounder commuter trains travel from Auburn to Downtown Seattle in approximately 30 minutes, and to Lakewood station in less than 35 minutes.

Until 1987, Auburn was home to a steam locomotive roundhouse and diesel engine house of the Northern Pacific Railway, the BNSF Railway of today. BNSF maintains a rail yard and small car repair facility, along with maintenance-of-way facilities at the former NP yard. The Auburn Municipal Airport serves the general aviation community.

Notable people

 Harrison Maurus, bronze medal Weightlifting athlete
 Nate Cohn, journalist and polling expert for The Upshot at The New York Times
Janna Crawford, gold medal Paralympic athlete
 Phil Fortunato, Politician. Member of Washington State Senate and former member of Washington House of Representatives.
 Cam Gigandet, actor
 Christine Gregoire, 22nd Governor of Washington
 Kevin Hagen, former MLB baseball player
 Greg Haugen, professional boxer
 Eric Barone, creator of Stardew Valley
 Gordon Hirabayashi, civil rights activist
 Ariana Kukors, Olympic swimmer and world record holder
 Chris Lukezic, middle-distance runner
 Evan McMullin, CIA officer and former presidential candidate
 Sir Mix-A-Lot, hip hop artist
 Onision, Youtuber
 Blair Rasmussen, NBA basketball player
 Dave Reichert, former King County Sheriff and U.S. Congressman
 Diane Schuur, jazz singer and pianist
 Francis R. "Dick" Scobee, NASA astronaut
 Danny Shelton, NFL football player
 D. C. Simpson, comic artist
 Misty Upham, actress
 Minoru Yamasaki, architect

City landmarks
The City of Auburn has designated the following landmarks:

Sister cities
Auburn has five sister cities:
 Tamba, Japan
 Pyeongchang, South Korea
 Guanghan, China
 Yuhang, China
  Mola di Bari, Italy

The relationship with Tamba is commemorated with an annual student exchange program between the two cities and neighboring Kent.

References

External links

 City website

 
Cities in King County, Washington
Cities in the Seattle metropolitan area
Cities in Pierce County, Washington
Populated places established in 1891
1891 establishments in Washington (state)
Cities in Washington (state)